The men's artistic team competition at the 2010 Asian Games in Guangzhou, China was held on 13 November 2010 at the Asian Games Town Gymnasium.

Schedule
All times are China Standard Time (UTC+08:00)

Results 
Legend
DNS — Did not start

References

Results

External links
Official website

Artistic Men Team